The Class 83 is a type of electric multiple unit operated by Keretapi Tanah Melayu on its KTM Komuter services. 22 sets were built by Hyundai Precision and Marubeni of South Korea and Japan respectively, in 3-car formations.

The KTM class 83 3-car formation consists of two motor cabs at either end of the set and a single trailer car in between, the trailer car in between is equipped with a Brecknell Willis pantograph for electric pick up. Narrow gangways integrate the 3-car sets. Each car features 3 double-leaf pneumatic sliding doors at either side which is the KTM class 83 the highest density of doors per rail-car in Malaysia.

Over the years, the KTM class 83 has been overhauled a number of times and its interior refurbished, however its interior layout, of longitudinal seating, has remained the same throughout it service life. However, four sets of class 83 has been refurbished for the KTM Skypark Link. The colour also changed from blue and yellow to orange and grey colour.

With the withdrawal of Adtranz/Walkers EMU for the Ampang Line, the KTM Class 83 is now the second oldest electric multiple unit in Malaysia after KTM Class 81.

Design 
The class 83 was designed with a streamlined sloped head with a large as per the front windows with two high beam lamps concentrated at the center top part of the cavity with two standard headlights at either bottom sides, later changed to LED lights in 2016. An AAR coupling system is used, and this is compatible with all of KTMB's modern rolling stock. Route direction is indicated on the top-right front of the train within a confined fluorescent lighted box using a lightly transparent plastic which is built integrated with the window shell, later replaced with LED destination indicator's in 2010. The drivers cab features a dedicated access to outside on top of the door access to the passenger area. The class 83 cab head is designed to be bottom heavy with the bulk of the power transformers located beneath the coach with full use of the top for passenger use, power traction motors are contained within the bogie itself. In terms of safety, the front outer frame is made of heavy carbonized steel, that is capable of sustaining high impact, same as KTM Class 82. 
 
Unlike the latter class 92, the class 83 like its sister classes are endowed with multi-layered tempered glass that is of a higher degree of impact resistance. 
 
Compared to the other classes, the class 83 was found to have the best acceleration among the 8x classes, and this is due to the Mitsubishi regenerative braking system being used which gave efficient energy conservation during braking and reasonable acceleration during runs.

Formations 

{| class="wikitable" style="font-size: 90%;"
!rowspan="2"|Set Designation
!colspan="3"|Car Number
!rowspan="2"|Status
|-
!Car 1
!Car 2
!Car 3
|-
|EMU 19
|C8301
|T8301
|C8302
| style="background: green; color: white" | In Service 
|-
|EMU 20
|C8303
|T8302
|C8304
| style="background: red; color: white" | Scrapped 
|-
|EMU 21
|C8305
|T8303
|C8306
| style="background: red; color: white" | Scrapped 
|-
|EMU 22
|C8307
|T8304
|C8308
| style="background: green; color: white" | In Service 
|-
|EMU 23
|C8309
|T8305
|C8310
| style="background: green; color: white" | In Service 
|-
|EMU 24
|C8311
|T8306
|C8312
| style="background: green; color: white" | In Service 
|-
|EMU 25
|C8313
|T8307
|C8314
| style="background: green; color: white" | In Service 
|-
|EMU 26
|C8315
|T8308
|C8316
| style="background: green; color: white" | In Service 
|-
|EMU 27
|C8317
|T8309
|C8318
| style="background: red; color: white" | Scrapped 
|-
|EMU 28
|C8319
|T8310
|C8320
| style="background: green; color: white" | In Service 
|-
|EMU 29
|C8321
|T8311
|C8322
| style="background: green; color: white" | In Service 
|-
|EMU 30
|C8323
|T8312
|C8324
| style="background: green; color: white" | In Service 
|-
|EMU 31
|C8325
|T8313
|C8326
| style="background: green; color: white" | In Service 
|-
|EMU 32
|C8327
|T8314
|C8328
| style="background: green; color: white" | In Service 
|-
|EMU 33
|C8329
|T8315
|C8330
| style="background: green; color: white" | In Service 
|-
|EMU 34
|C8331
|T8316
|C8332
| style="background: red; color: white" | Scrapped 
|-
|EMU 35
|C8333
|T8317
|C8334
| style="background: green; color: white" | In Service 
|-
|EMU 36
|C8335
|T8318
|C8336
| style="background: red; color: white" | Scrapped 
|-
|EMU 37
|C8337
|T8319
|C8338
| style="background: red; color: white" | Scrapped 
|-
|EMU 38
|C8339
|T8320
|C8340
| style="background: red; color: white" | Scrapped 
|-
|EMU 39
|C8341
|T8321
|C8342
| style="background: green; color: white" | In Service 
|-
|EMU 40
|C8343
|T8322
|C8344
| style="background: green; color: white" | In Service 
|}

Accidents and incidents 
On 1 November 2013, EMU19 derailed near Rawang station while moving through a track switch. No one was hurt in the incident. The two rear coaches were separated and towed away using a locomotive while the remaining front coach removed by use of cranes.

References 

KTM Komuter
Multiple units of Malaysia

25 kV AC multiple units
Hyundai Rotem multiple units